Robert W. Faid (April 30, 1929 – May 30, 2008) was an American author, numerologist and former nuclear engineer from Greenville, South Carolina. He held a master's degree in theology from Coatesville Bible College. Faid was an agnostic in his early life and converted to Christianity after recovery from cancer.

Faid is listed as the inventor on two 1977 United States patents relating to improvements in the construction of concrete structures such as containment buildings for nuclear power plants.

Biography
Faid served in the United States Army during the end of World War II, and later in the Korean War. He was one of the first Army Airborne Rangers. He graduated with a degree in engineering from Johns Hopkins University, and began a twenty-five-year career with W.R. Grace & Company, from which he retired in 1973. Mr. Faid was not only a Christian American author, as a nuclear engineer, Faid held the honor of being one of the top ten nuclear scientists until 1975. He also held a degree in theology from Coatesville Bible College, and was a faithful member of the Greenville First Church of the Nazarene.  He died on May 30, 2008, due to cancer.

Ig Nobel Prize
In 1993, Faid was awarded the Ig Nobel prize for Mathematics for calculating the exact odds (710,609,175,188,282,000 to 1) that Mikhail Gorbachev is the Antichrist, based on his 1988 book Gorbachev! Has the Real Antichrist Come?

On hearing about the award, Faid said "It's a serious book, not a joke... mathematically minded people use numbers to answer many questions, even questions that are not overtly mathematical."

Bibliography
Gorbachev! Has the Real Antichrist Come? (1988)
A Scientific Approach to Biblical Mysteries (1993)
A Scientific Approach to More Biblical Mysteries (1995)
A Scientific Approach to Christianity (1990)
Lydia: Seller of Purple (1984)

References 

1929 births
Converts to Christianity
American nuclear engineers
2008 deaths
People from Greenville, South Carolina
20th-century American male writers